Melin-y-Wig is a village in Denbighshire, Wales.  It is situated on the River Clwyd (Welsh: Afon Clwyd).  Rising in the nearby Clocaenog Forest (grid reference SJ045535), the river flows due south up to Melin-y-Wig, when it suddenly changes direction north-eastwards.

The village once had its own school, but in the mid 1960s, it was decided to close it in favour of the primary school in Betws Gwerful Goch.  The last headteacher was Mr Oswyn Williams.

Melin-y-Wig is noted for a Welsh nursery rhyme about it:

Bachgen bach o Felin-y-wig,

welodd o 'rioed damaid o gig;

Gwelodd falwen ar y bwrdd,

cipiodd ei gap a rhedodd i ffwrdd.'This translates as:

A little boy from Melin-y-wig,

he never saw a morsel of meat;

He saw a snail on the table,

he snatched his hat and ran away.Dinas Melin-y-Wig'

Dinas Melin-y-Wig is the remains of an Iron Age hillfort, dated about c. 800 BC – AD 74. The monument has helped understanding of later prehistoric defensive organisation and settlement.

References 

Villages in Denbighshire